Cas Ruffelse  ( – ) was a Dutch male footballer. He was part of the Netherlands national football team, playing 8 matches and scoring 3 goals. He played his first match on 21 December 1907.

See also
 List of Dutch international footballers

References

1888 births
1958 deaths
Dutch footballers
Netherlands international footballers
Sparta Rotterdam players
Footballers from Rotterdam

Association footballers not categorized by position